Blink is a Session Initiation Protocol (SIP) client distributed under the Blink license (GNU GPLv3 with an exception to permit the inclusion of commercial proprietary modules).

The software is written in Python for macOS's Cocoa, with a later port to Qt for supporting Microsoft Windows, Linux, AmigaOS.

Features 

Blink is based on the Session Initiation Protocol, and beyond voice over IP, its features also include video,  instant messaging, file transfer and multi-party conferencing sessions based on MSRP protocol, remote desktop sharing using  RFB protocol (VNC), and SIMPLE presence using XCAP protocol. Compatible with Asterix.

Alternative to Skype 
According to  Jason Hibbets, an Advisor at Red Hat, Blink is a popular alternative to Skype

Privacy and Security 
The Linux and macOS version of Blink implement OTR protocol end-to-end encryption and peer verification for chat media. All versions provide audio and video media encryption using ZRTP.

References

 Adrian Georgescu (AG Projects) "Blink, SIP beyond VoIP".

External links
 Homepage

Free VoIP software
Software that uses GNUstep